This is a list of current and former Roman Catholic churches in the Roman Catholic Archdiocese of Cincinnati. The archdiocese covers the southwest region of the U.S. state of Ohio, including the greater Cincinnati and Dayton metropolitan areas. The cathedral church of the archdiocese is the Cathedral Basilica of Saint Peter in Chains in Cincinnati.

Though not part of the archdiocese, the Cincinnati metropolitan area also includes the Cathedral Basilica of the Assumption in Covington, Kentucky, located across the Ohio River from Cincinnati.

Cincinnati

Current churches

Former churches

Dayton

Other cities

References

 
Cincinnati